RISAT-2BR1 is a synthetic-aperture radar (SAR) imaging satellite built by Indian Space Research Organisation (ISRO). It is part of India's RISAT series of SAR imaging satellite and fourth satellite in the series. RISAT-2BR1 was launched on 11 December 2019 at 09:55 UTC aboard Polar Satellite Launch Vehicle PSLV-C48 from First Launch Pad (FLP) of Satish Dhawan Space Centre. It was the 50th launch of Polar Satellite Launch Vehicle and 75th launch from Satish Dhawan Space Centre.

Overview 
The RISAT-2BR1 is follow on to RISAT-2B and has an X-band SAR with unfurlable radial rib reflector antenna of 3.6 meter diameter. RISAT-2BR1 can operate in different modes including Very High Resolution imaging modes of 1 x 0.5 m resolution and 0.5 x 0.3 m resolution  with swath of 5 to 10 km. 

 Mass:  
 Orbit:  (circular) at inclination of 37.0° 
 Mission life: 5 years

Launch 
RISAT-2BR1 was launched aboard PSLV-C48 on 11 December 2019 at 09:55 UTC with nine other ride-sharing commercial satellites from First Launch Pad of Satish Dhawan Space Centre, SHAR. Launch vehicle used was -QL variant of Polar Satellite Launch Vehicle with four PSOM-XL strap-ons and employed a 195 kg Dual Launch Adapter (DLA) to accommodate primary and secondary payloads. After a flight of 16 minutes 27 seconds, RISAT-2BR1 was separated from PSLV fourth stage (PS4) and injected into 576 km circular orbit with 37.0° inclination. After primary payload, DLA and subsequently nine other co-passenger satellites were separated. RISAT-2BR1 deployed it solar panels within 3 minutes after separation and deployed its 3.6 meter antenna on 08:30 UTC, on 12 December 2019.

Secondary payloads 
Nine commercial ridesharing satellites weighed 157.6 kg cumulatively.

 QPS SAR-1 "Izanagi"「イザナギ」(~100 kg) X-band SAR imaging satellite with 3.6 m antenna by iQPS.

 Four Lemur-2 cubesats by Spire Global.

 Duchifat-3 (2.3 kg) by Sha'ar Hanegev High School students built at Herzliya Science Center.

 1HOPSAT (22 kg) high resolution video and imaging satellite by Hera systems for Seguritech of Mexico.

 Tyvak-0129 (11 kg) 

 Tyvak-0092 (5 kg) (NANOVA)

See also 

 List of Indian satellites

References 

Spacecraft launched by India in 2019
Earth observation satellites of India
Space synthetic aperture radar
Spacecraft launched by PSLV rockets
December 2019 events in India